Morgantown is a home rule-class city in, and the seat of Butler County, Kentucky, United States. The population was 2,471 at the time of the 2020 Census

History

The settlement may have originally been called Funkhouser Hill after Christopher Funkhouser, the local landowner who donated  of land to establish a seat for the newly formed Butler County in 1811. The etymology of the city's present name (originally written Morgan Town) is uncertain. It may have been chosen to honor a hunter named Morgan or to honor Daniel Morgan Smith, the first white child born in the town. It was incorporated as Morgantown by the state assembly in 1813, although the post office also went by the name Butler Court House during the 19th century.

Granville Allen, a member of the 17th Kentucky Infantry, was one of the first Union soldiers to die in the Civil War, in a skirmish on October 29, 1861. A monument was erected by the Granville Allen Post #93 GAR. This first skirmish between the North and South took place on the Daniel Boone Johnson property. The Johnson Cemetery is still there and is directly above the monument, which is a limestone marker cut into the side of the old Logansport road.

Morgantown has one of only two monuments in the country dedicated to soldiers of both sides who died in the Civil War. The Confederate-Union Veterans' Monument in Morgantown is located on the grounds of the county courthouse.

The city formerly had a sister city in Tatsuruhama, Japan, but that city is now part of Nanao.

Geography
Morgantown is located near the center of Butler County at  (37.219465, -86.692513). It is situated on the top of a bluff on the west side of the Green River.

Climate
The climate in this area is characterized by hot, humid summers and generally mild to cool winters.  According to the Köppen Climate Classification system, Morgantown has a humid subtropical climate, abbreviated "Cfa" on climate maps.

Demographics

As of the census of 2000, there were 2,544 people, 1,051 households, and 627 families residing in the city. The racial makeup of the city was 95.52% White, 1.10% African American, 0.16% Native American, 0.31% Asian, 2.36% from other races, and 0.55% from two or more races. Hispanic or Latino of any race were 3.22% of the population.

There were 1,051 households, out of which 29.0% had children under the age of 18 living with them, 40.9% were married couples living together, 15.3% had a female householder with no husband present, and 40.3% were non-families. 36.9% of all households were made up of individuals, and 18.5% had someone living alone who was 65 years of age or older. The average household size was 2.23 and the average family size was 2.90.

In the city, the population was spread out, with 23.0% under the age of 18, 11.2% from 18 to 24, 24.8% from 25 to 44, 21.0% from 45 to 64, and 19.9% who were 65 years of age or older. The median age was 38 years. For every 100 females, there were 82.9 males. For every 100 females age 18 and over, there were 76.9 males.

The median income for a household in the city was $19,912, and the median income for a family was $27,218. Males had a median income of $24,671 versus $18,594 for females. The per capita income for the city was $12,100. About 24.9% of families and 27.6% of the population were below the poverty line, including 36.0% of those under age 18 and 21.2% of those age 65 or over.

In 2010, Morgantown had the 16th-lowest median household income of all places in the United States with a population over 1,000.

Transportation

Prior to 1917, the city's primary channel of transportation was the Green River. However, in 1917, the river froze, leaving the city without supplies for two months. A subsequent period of road-building began, and in 1930, a road connecting Morgantown with Bowling Green provided an alternate conduit for commerce.

Morgantown is now served by Interstate 165 and it is along the proposed Interstate 67 corridor. Other major roads serving the city include U.S. Highway 231, Kentucky Route 70, and Kentucky Route 79. Kentucky Route 403 is a minor artery in and out of town.

The city does not have railroad service.

Education
Morgantown is home to these public schools as part of the Butler County Schools District:
Morgantown Elementary
Butler County Middle School
Butler County High School
Morgantown also has a lending library, the Butler County Public Library.

Arts and culture
Morgantown's municipal park, Charles Black City Park, is home to the annual Green River Catfish Festival held the week of July 4. The festival has been held annually since July 1980. In addition to the city park, the catfish festival also includes a catfish tournament on the Green River, where the grand prize is $2,500.

Notable people
 William S. Taylor, 33rd Governor of Kentucky 
 John Moore, bishop of the Methodist Episcopal Church, South
 Keith Butler, pitcher, St. Louis Cardinals organization
Tyler Reed (swimmer)

References

External links

City of Morgantown official website

Cities in Butler County, Kentucky
Cities in Kentucky
County seats in Kentucky